Berisso is a city and the head town of the partido of Berisso in Buenos Aires Province, Argentina. It forms part of the Greater La Plata urban area and has a population of approximately 95,021 as of 2001.

People

Berisso was founded by Italian immigrants, and settled by Italians and other European immigrants. Most Berissenses (name referring to the people of Berisso) are of Italian, Ukrainian, or Polish descent, but include those of Spanish, German, Portuguese, Albanian, Arab, Bulgarian, Croatian, Armenian, Slovak, Irish, Lithuanian, Jewish and Greek descent.

Because it is home to many ethnicities, Berisso is known as "The Provincial Capital of the Immigrant." Berisso's diversity is celebrated on September with their own "Immigrant's Festival."

External links

 Official Site
 Foro Berisso
 Church of Nuestra Señora de Loreto website

Populated places in Buenos Aires Province
La Plata
Cities in Argentina
Argentina